John C. Hall (May 21, 1821November 29, 1896) was an American medical doctor, politician, and Wisconsin pioneer.  He was a member of the Wisconsin State Senate, representing Green County in 1870 and 1871, and served as a Union Army surgeon in the American Civil War.

Biography

Born in Langdon, New Hampshire, Hall went to the public schools, North Yarmouth Academy, and Westbrook Seminary. In 1852, Hall received his medical degree from Harvard Medical School and moved, that same year, to Monroe, Wisconsin, where he practiced medicine.

During the American Civil War, Hall served in the 6th Wisconsin Infantry Regiment as surgeon of the regiment. In 1870 and 1871, Hall was elected to the Wisconsin State Senate; although he would later be described as "a Democrat in politics", he was elected as an "Independent Republican" over the official Republican nominee.

During the first presidency of Grover Cleveland, Hall was appointed president of the Board of United States Pension Examiners for Wisconsin.  In 1891, Hall retired from the medical practice and left Wisconsin for the state of Washington.  Subsequently, during Cleveland's second term as president, Hall was appointed to the Board of Pension Examiners in Washington.

In Washington, Hall resided at Medical Lake, Washington, where he retired. He died in Medical Lake, Washington.

Personal life and family
John C. Hall married Theodate Stackpole.  Hall was survived by his wife and two children.  Their daughter, Theo Hall, served as postmaster at Medical Lake, Washington.

Electoral history

| colspan="6" style="text-align:center;background-color: #e9e9e9;"| General Election, November 2, 1869

References

Further reading

External links

1821 births
1896 deaths
People from Langdon, New Hampshire
People from Monroe, Wisconsin
People from Medical Lake, Washington
People of Wisconsin in the American Civil War
Harvard Medical School alumni
Physicians from Wisconsin
Republican Party Wisconsin state senators
19th-century American politicians
Westbrook College alumni
North Yarmouth Academy alumni